George Edward Vernot (February 27, 1901 – November 22, 1962) was a Canadian freestyle swimmer who competed at the 1920 and 1924 Olympics.

At the 1920 Summer Olympics in Antwerp, Vernot won a silver medal in the 1500-metre freestyle, and a bronze medal in the 400-metre event. He also competed in the 100-metre freestyle, but placed third in his semifinal and did not advance. At the 1924 Summer Olympics in Paris, he was seventh in the 400-metre freestyle, and eighth in the 1500-metre freestyle.

Nationally, Vernot won the Canadian championships in the 100-, 220-, and 440-yard freestyle in 1919, and 220- and 440-yard in 1920. In 1926 he graduated in civil engineering from McGill University and retired from athletic competitions. He then worked for the City of Montreal, becoming chairman of the Board of Assessors in 1948. In 1969 a park in Montreal was named in his honor.

See also
 List of McGill University people
 List of Olympic medalists in swimming (men)

References

External links

1901 births
1962 deaths
Swimmers from Montreal
Canadian male freestyle swimmers
Olympic bronze medalists for Canada
Olympic silver medalists for Canada
Olympic bronze medalists in swimming
Olympic swimmers of Canada
Swimmers at the 1920 Summer Olympics
Swimmers at the 1924 Summer Olympics
Medalists at the 1920 Summer Olympics
Olympic silver medalists in swimming